The Cologne Comedy Festival is an international comedy festival held in Cologne, Germany, every year since 1991.  It was founded by Achim Rohde in 1990 in Kleve. The festival initially started by importing comedians from around the world.  During the 1990s, stand-up comedy became popular with young German audiences, who had experienced it whilst living outside Germany.  This led to home-grown comedy acts, which in turn caused the growth of the festival until its present size, where stars of German and of international comedy perform in more than 20 sold-out venues, ranging from small clubs to large theatres.  Many German comedy acts were discovered at this festival.

Awards
Since 1997, the Cologne Comedy Festival awards the annual German Comedy Prize. Its categories are:

 Best comedy show
 Best comedy series
 Best sketch show
 Best comedy improvement
 Best actor/actress
 Best newcomer
 Best comedian
 Best comedienne
 Best film comedy
 Honorary prize

Offshoots
Since 2007, the Comedy Festival runs in tandem with a Comedy Film Festival.

See also
Hollywood's Comedy Nights

References

Comedy festivals in Germany
Recurring events established in 1991
Festivals in Cologne
Tourist attractions in Cologne
1991 establishments in Germany
Annual events in Germany